Tots TV is a British children's television programme, produced by Ragdoll Productions and Central. The series was first telecast in the UK on the ITV network (part of CITV) from 1993 to 1998.

Development
Tots TV was written by two of its puppeteers, Robin Stevens (Tom) and Andrew Davenport (Tiny).

Characters
The programme focuses on three puppets: Tilly, a French girl, with red hair, freckles and pale skin, who speaks in basic French (changed to English in French and Spanish broadcasts, and changed to Spanish in the US version), Tom, a blue-haired boy with glasses and dark skin, who is smart, and Tiny, the youngest Tot, who is smaller than the others and has green hair and pale skin. It also includes their pet Donkey who lives in a stable next to the Tots' secret house and a mischievous little dog named Furryboo that the Tots do not know about.

Voices
 Tilly (played by three actresses – initially Véronique Déroulède, then Claire Carre and later Alexandra Hogg [María Moscardó in the US version]).
 Tom (played by Robin Stevens [Mark Heenehan in the US version])
 Tiny (played by Andrew Davenport [Kevin Clash in the US version])

Plots

Going out
Often (although not always), the Tots would go out to explore an everyday area in the real world. This often involved them helping out a young child, visiting Jane Pardoe at Whipsnade Wild Animal Park, and watching Jack the Gardener who was always placing surprise items in a field for children to play with. 
This also sometimes involved them using their magic bag which they always took with them, Tiny always carried it and Tilly always operated it. When asked to help, it would always produce some items to help them in the situation.

Staying in
In many other episodes, the Tots would do something in their secret house, including playing games and making exciting discoveries. Because the full titles featured the Tots leaving the house they were altered for such episodes.
Often these episodes would feature one of the Tots reading the other two a story. These episodes always feature the reading Tot preparing to read using dolls of the characters in the story. Apparently, the other two were unaware they were preparing to read a story because they would always ring them up on their personal phone to ask if they wanted to listen to a story. This was despite the fact they all lived in the same house.

Other
If the episode was a full-length double-bill (regularly the first half with Jane Pardoe and the second half an adventure in the secret house) in the earlier episodes, they would be joined with a two-minute animation of a 'Noah's Ark' story (based on the toy "Noah's Ark in the Secret House") or an animation of a picture that a viewer had sent into the program.

Recurring jokes
Furryboo is always causing mischief or even helping the Tots out (one such moment was when he helped put the star on the top of their Christmas tree), but they never know he's there.
When things go wrong or the Tots are just being silly, they call each other names like "Banana", "Sausage" and "Tomato".
The Tots have telephones which signify their favourite colour with the same phone number of 12345, that they use to communicate with each other, even if they are only a small space away.

Episodes
Episodes Included:
Middle Of The Night
Hippo
Furry Beat
Tom's Trumpet
Old McTom
Tiny's Box Song
Tilly's Recorder
Castle
Cleaning Windows
Birthday Surprise
Naughty Little Pig
Tiny Leaves Home
Lost in the Supermarket
Postwoman
What's That Noise?
Vegetable Guard
Disco Machine
A Sticky Mess
Missing the Bus
Naughty Mysterious Person
The Dentist
Owl
Hedgehog
Peacock
Bus Ride
Rabbit
Space Robots
Tiny's Box
Rhino
Dreamy Tilly
Bike Ride
Donkey Ride
Fox
Camel
Roller Skating
Lemur
Snail
Hedgehog
Windy Day
Apple Picking
Kittens
Playground
Bike Ride
Dress
Peacock
Dog
Elephant

Telecast
The series was first telecasted in the UK on the ITV network (part of CITV).

In April 2004, Ragdoll and Carlton International announced that they had secured a broadcast deal with the BBC to rebroadcast the series from that month, where it first aired on the CBeebies on BBC Two block as well as the CBeebies channel.

Internationally, the series was also telecast in the United States on the PBS network from 1996 to 2002 with Tilly speaking Spanish, instead of French. In 2000, Discovery Kids broadcast the series throughout Central and South America, the Caribbean and the Falkland Islands. In Holland, the series is aired on Kindernet.

Awards
The series won two BAFTA awards for its producer Anne Wood and director Vic Finch.

Specials

A number of special episodes of the series were produced for both TV and VHS release, including a short series of episodes set in the USA, a 'Big Treasure Adventure' set on a pirate ship from England to Australia and several Christmas specials, including one filmed in Rovaniemi, Finland.

A series of educational Tots Video specials were originally released by Video Collection International in 1997 (later reprinted by Carlton in 2000) included hour-long episodes based on the alphabet, numbers, animals and basic French.

VHS releases
Videotapes of the series were originally released by Video Collection International under their Central Video imprint from 1993 until 1994, and transitioned off to Carlton Home Entertainment afterward and later Granada Ventures.

Year 1993: Camel and other stories (VC1299)
(Camel, Beach, Fox)
Year 1993: Hedgehog and other stories (VC1300)
(Trains, Hedgehog, Dress)
Year 1993: Owl and other stories (VC1303)
(Bike Ride, Owl, Donkey Ride)
Year 1993: Peacock and other stories (VC1307)
(Peacock, Bus Ride, Rabbit)
Year 1993: Elephant and other stories (VC1313)
(Horse, Baby Party, Elephant)
Year 1993: Apple Picking and other stories (VC1315)
(Apple Picking, Kittens, Playground)
Year 1994: Dog and other stories (VC1322)
(Woodlouse, Cars, Dog)
Year 1994: Roller Skating and other stories (VC1323)
(Lemur, Roller Skating, Snail)
Year 1994: Giraffe and other stories (VC1324)
(Rockpool, Giraffe, Dentist)
Year 1994: Wiggly Worms and other stories (VC1325)
(How Does Your Garden Grow?, Wiggly Worms, Cleaning Windows)
Year 1994: Windy Day and other stories (VC1327)
(Penguin, Windy Day, The Hungry Nanny Goat)
Year 1994: Bumper Special: Bike Ride and other stories (VC1361)
(Dress, Bike Ride, Donkey Ride, Peacock, Cars, Dog)
Year 1995: The Funny Noises Band and other stories (VC1384)
(Mountain Climbing, The Funny Noises Band, Tiny's Storybook (Little Red Car), Fluffy Little Chicks, Dressing Up, Bubbles)
Out to Sea and other stories
(Splashing in the Pool, Hippo in the Garden, Colours, Out to Sea, Tiny's Storybook, Bananas, Parcels)
Sticky Disasters and other stories 
(Sticky Disasters, A Watery Surprise, Trouble in the Bathroom, Washing the Car, Blowing Bubbles, Big Banana Tom)
Lost Teddy and other stories
(Lost Teddy, Lost Button, The Vegetable Nibbler, A Very Clever Monkey, The Disappearing Trousers, Cable Car, Where is That Phone?)
Magical Secrets and other stories
(Magical Secrets, Tots In A Box, Magic In The Woods, Magic Balloons, Music Factory, Magical Night Time Garden, Secret Treasure Map)
Bumper Special: Donkey Ride and other stories
(Donkey Ride, At the Airport, Tiny's Storybook, Undersea Adventure, It's Only Thunder, Safety on the Beach, Fun on the Beach, Donkey Cake, Watering the Garden, Ants, Naughty Little Fly, Melon Cheese, Rainy Day, Koala)
Secret Magic Parcels and other stories
(The Secret Magic Parcels, Fishes, A Noisy Surprise, Tom's Storybook, Looking in the Mirror, Feeding the Calves)
Fluffy Little Chicks and other stories
(Fluffy Little Chicks, It's a Cockerel, Milking a Cow, Raspberry Picking, Tom's Storybook, A Pool for the Ducks)
Super Tiny and other stories
(Super Tiny, Laundrette, King of the Castle, Tom's Storybook, Naughty Mysterious Person, Iguana)
Flying High and other stories
(Flying High, Tom's Storybook, The Village Band, Sticky Surprise, Tilly's Storybook, Sea Lions, Three Little Pigs, Doctor, Tiny's Storybook, A Special Party Cake)
A Painting Surprise and other stories
(Lost In the Supermarket, Tilly's Storybook, Tiny Leaves Home, The Naughty Little Pig, A Sticky Mess, A Painting Surprise)
The Runaway Horse and other stories
(The Runaway Horse, Tiny's Storybook, A Doughy Squeezy Surprise, Sausage Surprise, A Rainy Day, Sandcastles)
The Lighthouse and other stories
(The Lighthouse, Party Time, Tom's Storybook, Blowing Games, Song Window, Flamingoes)
Hopping Day and other stories
(Sheep, Boing Boing, Tilly's Storybook, All Fall Down, Naughty Old Ball, Hopping Day)
Birthday Surprise and other stories
(Birthday Surprise, Dress, Peacock)
Cuddly Bunnies and other stories
(Cuddly Bunnies, Splish Splash Splosh, New Shoes, Spring Cleaning, Chinchilla, Smart Day, Flower Friend)
Naughty Puppies and other stories
(The Naughty Puppies, Tom's Storybook, Accidents Will Happen, The Dirty Old Boat, Watering the Garden, A Watery Surprise)
Hamster and other stories
(The Happy Hamster, Squashed Donkey, Guide Dog, Animal Concert, The Funny Furry Otter, A Cat Called Brian, Zebras)
Bumper Special: Penguin and other stories
(Penguin, Windy Day, The Hungry Nanny Goat, How Does Your Garden Grow, Wiggly Worms, Cleaning Windows)
Wobbly Jellies and other stories
(Wobbly Jellies, Feeding the Ducks, Tom's Fast Food Takeaway, A Special Cake, Tom's Storybook, Baking Bread, Hippo)
Bumper Special: Kittens and other stories
(Apple Picking, Kittens, Playground, Horse, Baby Party, Elephant)
Dentist and other stories
(Dentist, Owl, Rockpool)
Bumper Special: Camping and other stories
(Camping, Painting, Lovely Old Toad, The Big Wheel, Tom's Storybook, Balancing Surprise, Donkey Goes Missing, Paper Boats)
Bumper Special: At the Beach and other stories
(At the Beach, Trains, Rockpool, Owl, Dentist, Hedgehog)
Boing Boing and other stories
(Boing Boing, Lemur, Jumping Up and Down, Hopping Day)
Naughty Little Pigs and other stories
(Naughty Little Pigs, Sheep, Feeding the Calves, Three Little Pigs)
Tiny Leaves Home and other stories 
(Tiny Leaves Home, Lost in the Supermarket, Dressing Up)
Mountain Climbing and other stories
(Mountain Climbing, Tom's Storybook, Out to Sea)
Bumper Special: Fox and other stories
(Fox, Roller-Skating, Camel, Giraffe, Snail, Woodlouse)
Bubbles and other stories
(Bubbles, A Rainy Day, Splashing in the Pool, A Watery Surprise)
Fishes and other stories
(Fishes, Tom's Storybook, Looking in the Mirror)
Sing Song Adventures
(Furry Beat, Tom's Trumpet, Disco Machine, Grand Old Duke of York, Tom Sings La La La, Old McTom, Tilly's Flute)
Snowy Adventure 
(60-minute Special)
Bedtime Stories
(Bedtime Stories, Bath, Far Away Star, Street Lamps, Night Time Teddy Adventure, Fun with Shadows, Time for Bed)
Summer Holiday Adventures
(Afternoon Adventure, Watching the Dolphins, Building a Playhouse, The Loch Ness Monster, Jumping Kangaroos, King of the Castle, Little Boats Big Boats)
Seaside Holiday Fun
(At the Beach, Donkey Ride, Rockpool)
Zoo Animals 
(Camel, Elephant, Giraffe)
Furry Friends
(Little Kittens, Cuddly Bunnies, A Happy Dog)

DVD

Birthday Surprise and other stories – (3 Episodes)
The Adventures of Tilly, Tom And Tiny – (11 Episodes)
Naughty Little Puppies and other stories  – (6 Episodes)
Snowy Adventure – (60 Minute Special + 2 Bonus Episodes)

Special releases

In 1997, four special VHS tapes were originally released under the name Tots Video. The four titles were re-released by Carlton Video in 2000 with the same titles. The four titles were:
Tilly, Tom and Tiny's A,B,C
Tilly, Tom and Tiny's Animal Adventures
Tilly, Tom and Tiny's Fun with French
Tilly, Tom and Tiny's 1,2,3

References

External links 
Tots TV at BBC

1993 British television series debuts
1998 British television series endings
1990s British children's television series
1990s preschool education television series
ITV children's television shows
British television shows featuring puppetry
Television series by ITV Studios
Television series by DHX Media
Television series by Ragdoll Productions
PBS original programming
PBS Kids shows
Television shows produced by Central Independent Television
English-language television shows
French-language television shows
Spanish-language television shows
Television shows set in Warwickshire
CBeebies
British preschool education television series